Southern Funen's List (Danish: Sydfyns Borgerliste) is a regional political party set in the municipalities on the southern parts of Funen, more specifically Faaborg-Midtfyn and Svendborg.

History
In 2005 and 2009, Southern Funen's List ran in Svendborg, Gudme and Egebjerg Municipality. After a fairly poor election in 2009, the party was dissolved.

In 2013, Jan Valbak, Palle Petersen and Palle Andersen re-founded the party, this time with more focus on Faaborg. The party received 1.505 votes, ensuring them a seat in the municipal council.

The name of the party was changed to Borgerlisten in the 2017 election, where the party did not receive enough votes for a seat in the municipal council.

Politicians from Southern Funen's List
Leif Nybo: Former chairman. 
Jan Valbak: Co-founder and current chairman.
Palle Petersen: Co-founder.
Palle Andersen: Co-founder.

Election results

Municipal elections

References

Local political parties in Denmark
Political parties with year of establishment missing